Antonio Ferretti (born 19 January 1957) is a Swiss former professional racing cyclist. He rode in three editions of the Tour de France.

References

External links
 

1957 births
Living people
Swiss male cyclists
Sportspeople from Ticino